Maurice J. "Sully" Sullivan (October 1909 – February 28, 1998) was an immigrant from Ireland who moved to Hawaii and was the co-founder, with See Goo Lau, of Foodland Super Markets, the largest and only locally owned supermarket chain in Hawaii.  The first store opened on May 6, 1948 in Honolulu, Hawaii.  By 2007, Foodland stores could be found on each of the four largest Hawaiian Islands and is the flagship of the Sullivan Family of Companies.     "Sully" also famously introduced McDonald's to Hawaii in 1968 as well as Dunkin' Donuts.  At one time, Forbes magazine rated Sullivan among the nation's 400 wealthiest people with a net worth of over $150 million.  Sullivan was succeeded by his daughter, Jenai S. Wall, as President of Foodland in 1995 and CEO in 1998, the year of his death.

As of 2012, heirs to Sullivan's fortune are listed as among Hawaii's Top 10 Richest People according to HawaiiBusiness magazine.

References

Irish emigrants to the United States
1909 births
1998 deaths
20th-century American businesspeople